Apsley Business School is a  business school, registered in London, England, with two central London Campuses. It offers management qualifications at the undergraduate, postgraduate and doctoral level of various partner-universities which are based across Europe including in the Netherlands, Austria, Slovakia, Japan and Poland. With 2 campuses in London, plus 3 campuses across Central Europe, Apsley, from Mid-2021, Apsley will open new campuses globally.

Apsley concentrates on qualifications in Strategic Management, Information Security, Education, Psychology, Hospitality and Tourism Management, Industrial Management and delivers blended learning qualifications recognised globally. Apsley was founded in December 2012. It offers PhD, DBA, MSc, MBA and the LLM in collaboration with Polish, Turkish, French, Czech, Swiss and Dutch universities, and has a strong Erasmus + programme across CEE, As well as being and Advanced Signatory for the United Nations Global Compact PRME programme. Apsley Business School is listed on the British Solicitors Regulation Authorty list of training providors for the Solcitors Training Examination (SQE), which is the examination to license to practice as an attorney in England and Wales 

Apsley also has a strong independent K12 school, with a global outreach programme. The Apsley Summer School was established in 2019 to develop International Business English programmes to teenagers from around the world

The school is incorporated in England and Wales (registered 11517526).

Apsley Business School is additionally OTHM accredited, which is regulated by government authority for vocational education (The Office of Qualifications and Examinations Regulation (Ofqual)).  and is on the recognised list of Learning Providors (UKPRN 10084917). It is listed on the Polish National Academic Database (Nauka Polska URN238055).

References

External links
 
United Nations Global Compact PRME
Solicitor Regulation Authority in England & Wales, List of Training Providors

Business schools in Austria
Business schools in the Czech Republic
Business schools in Slovakia
Business schools in France
Business schools in Japan
Business schools in Hungary
Business schools in England
Business schools in Europe
Business schools in Brazil
Business schools in Nigeria
Grade I listed buildings in the City of Westminster
Business schools in the United Arab Emirates
Universities UK
Educational institutions established in 2012